The BMW R 18 is a cruiser motorcycle manufactured by BMW Motorrad and was officially introduced in April 2020 and launched in September 2020 in Germany. Due to the COVID-19 pandemic, an official introduction at the BMW dealers was not possible, therefore it was presented virtually on the internet.

Conception 
BMW started development in 2015 and later, presented information on the forthcoming model's design and specifications. The design and visible technique is mainly based on the 1936/37 BMW R5.
The R 18 is BMW's second attempt, after the BMW R1200C to tap into the market segment of heavy cruisers, currently dominated by Harley-Davidson, Indian, British Triumph Thunderbird or Triumph Rocket III, Moto Guzzi's Cruiser or Japanese Honda, Kawasaki, Suzuki and Yamaha. The R 18's conversion-friendly design will ease modifications for riders interested in the custom bike scene following a similar approach as the one taken with the BMW R nineT.

Construction 
The bike comes with a double-loop tubular steel frame, exposed propshaft and spoked wheels. The rear wheel is guided by a cantilever rear swingarm, whose bearings and spring/damper unit are concealed to give the impression of a rigid frame without rear suspension. 
Otherwise, modern technology such as an partially integral anti-lock braking system (cornering ABS), assistance systems, fuel injection and upside-down telescopic fork is installed. The motorcycle is powered by a newly developed air and oil-cooled ,  two-cylinder boxer. It is the largest two-cylinder boxer engine for motorcycles built by BMW so far. The valves of the four-stroke engine are controlled by tappets, push rods above the cylinders and rocker arms. In contrast to the design studies equipped with carburetors, the production model has an electronically controlled injection system with digital engine management and electronic throttle control. Exhaust gas purification is achieved by a 3-way catalytic converter. The power output is 91 HP at 4750 rpm and a maximum torque of 158 Nm at 3000 rpm, whereby in the speed range between 2000 and 4000 rpm there is always more than 150 Nm.

References

External links

 BMW R 18 on bmwmotorcycles.com
 Repairwiki for maintenance, service and repair.

R 18
Motorcycles powered by flat engines
Shaft drive motorcycles
Motorcycles introduced in 2020
Cruiser motorcycles